Niagara County Courthouse and County Clerk's Office is a historic courthouse and county clerk's building located at Lockport in Niagara County, New York. The two buildings are located along Hawley Street, north and south of Niagara Street.  The county clerk's building is a one-story, limestone office building constructed in 1856 in the Classical Revival style. The original section of the courthouse building was constructed in 1886 in the Second Empire style, with additions constructed in 1915-17 and 1955–58.

It was listed on the National Register of Historic Places in 1997.

Gallery

References

External links
Niagara County Courthouse and County Clerk's Office - Lockport, NY - U.S. National Register of Historic Places on Waymarking.com

County clerks in New York (state)
County government agencies in New York (state)
Courthouses on the National Register of Historic Places in New York (state)
Neoclassical architecture in New York (state)
Government buildings completed in 1856
County courthouses in New York (state)
Buildings and structures in Niagara County, New York
National Register of Historic Places in Niagara County, New York
1856 establishments in New York (state)